Cedric McKinley (born March 26, 1987) is an American former Canadian football defensive lineman, most notably for the Edmonton Eskimos of the Canadian Football League (CFL). He played college football at Minnesota, and was originally signed as an undrafted free agent by the Minnesota Vikings of the National Football League (NFL) in 2010. He has also been a member of the NFL's New England Patriots, the AFL's Chicago Rush, and the CFL's Saskatchewan Roughriders.

College career

McKinley played college football for the Minnesota Golden Gophers as a defensive end from 2008 to 2009. In 23 games, he achieved 43 tackles, three fumble recoveries, and two forced fumbles.

Professional career

McKinley signed as an undrafted free agent with the Minnesota Vikings of the National Football League on July 4, 2010 but was released on June 28. He was again signed by the Vikings on July 31, 2011, but was waived prior to the start of the regular season on September 3. He spent some time on the Vikings' practice squad before being released on October 25. He joined the practice squad of the New England Patriots from December 20–26, 2011.

In 2012, McKinley played for the Chicago Rush of the Arena Football League, recording 7 total tackles, 2 pass breakups, and 2 sacks.

He was signed to the Edmonton Eskimos on August 28, 2014 as a defensive tackle. In his first season with the Eskimos, he played in seven CFL regular season games, starting in one. McKinley started the 2015 season on the practice roster.

On July 10, 2016, the Eskimos traded McKinley to the Saskatchewan Roughriders. The Roughriders released McKinley in August 2016.

Life after football
As of January 2017, McKinley is an assistant caretaker and security guard at South High School in Minneapolis.

Statistics

References 

1987 births
Living people
African-American players of American football
African-American players of Canadian football
Edmonton Elks players
Saskatchewan Roughriders players
Canadian football defensive linemen
American football defensive ends
Minnesota Golden Gophers football players
Players of American football from Minnesota
Sportspeople from Alabama
21st-century African-American sportspeople
20th-century African-American people